, born , was an empress consort (chūgū) of Emperor Go-Suzaku of Japan.

Life 
Genshi's father Atsuyasu died in 1018. Her mother was the younger sister of Fujiwara no Yorimichi's official wife, Princess Takahime, and so the daughterless Yorimichi adopted her.  

In 1036, she acted as a substitute court lady in the purification ceremony at Emperor Go-Suzaku's first niiname-sai harvest festival. Two months later she was made chūgū, displacing the existing empress consort Princess Teishi to kōgō and souring relations between Teishi and Yorimichi. Favored by the Emperor, Genshi bore him two girls, but died in childbirth at the age of 23 without giving birth to a prince.

Amidst the lightning and thunder and heavy rain, Genshi died on the spot. At the time, there was a rumor that the Fujiwara family god of Kasuga-taisha was angered that Genshi had been made Empress through adoption into the Fujiwara clan, despite blood ties to the Minamoto clan.

Issue 

 Imperial Princess Yūshi/Sukeko (祐子内親王) (1038–1105) - (Sanpon-Jusangū, 三品准三宮)
 Imperial Princess Baishi (禖子内親王) (Rokujō Saiin, 六条斎院) (1039–1096) - Saiin at Kamo Shrine 1046–1058

Notes

Fujiwara clan
Japanese empresses
1016 births
1039 deaths
Deaths in childbirth